Zaluzania is a genus of flowering plants in the family Asteraceae.

 Species
All the species are native to Mexico; one also crosses the border into the United States.
 Zaluzania asperrima Sch.Bip. - Puebla
 Zaluzania augusta (Lag.) Sch.Bip. - Durango, Hidalgo, Guanajuato
 Zaluzania cinerascens Sch.Bip.	- Hidalgo
 Zaluzania delgadoana B.L.Turner - Durango
 Zaluzania discoidea A.Gray - Chihuahua
 Zaluzania ensifolia (Sch.Bip.) Sch.Bip. - Sinaloa
 Zaluzania grayana B.L.Rob. & Greenm. - Chihuahua, Arizona (Cochise Co), New Mexico (Hidalgo Co)
 Zaluzania megacephala Sch.Bip.	- Hidalgo, Nuevo León, Querétaro
 Zaluzania mollissima A.Gray - San Luis Potosí, Zacatecas
 Zaluzania montagnifolia (Sch.Bip.) Sch.Bip. - Oaxaca, Puebla, Guerrero
 Zaluzania parthenioides (DC.) Rzed. - Nuevo León
 Zaluzania pringlei Greenm. - Morelos
 Zaluzania subcordata W.M.Sharp - Oaxaca, Puebla
 Zaluzania triloba (Ortega) Pers. - Zacatecas, Tamaulipas, San Luis Potosí, Nuevo León, México State, Hidalgo, Coahuila, Aguascalientes

References

Heliantheae
Asteraceae genera
Flora of North America